George Croydon Marks, 1st Baron Marks, CBE (9 June 1858 – 24 September 1938), known as Sir George Marks between 1911 and 1929, was an English engineer, patent agent and Liberal (later Labour) politician.

Background and education
Marks was born in Eltham in Kent, the eldest of eight children of William Marks and Amelia Adelaide Croydon, of whom only four survived childhood. After attending a local private school, at age 13 he became apprenticed at the Royal Arsenal, Woolwich, where his father William was a foreman, and continued his general education part-time at the Royal Arsenal School. At 17, he won a Whitworth Exhibition for two years at King's College, University of London.

Business career
Noted by many as a disciple of Brunel, he joined Sir Richard Tangye's company, whose works were closely associated with funicular lifts. Marks was appointed head of the lift department, in which role he was in charge of the installation of the Saltburn Cliff Lift. 1880, he set up a private practice in Birmingham and married Margaret Maynard; they never had any children. In 1887 he formed a partnership with Dugald Clerk, forming the international intellectual property firm Marks & Clerk, which now operates in 18 countries worldwide. The firm became big enough to move its headquarters to London in 1893, with branches in Birmingham and Manchester. Developing a number of cliff railways and steep-incline tramcar systems, including the Matlock Cable Tramway in 1893, the Swansea Constitution Hill Incline Railway in 1896–8, commissions included the design of the new Gothic pavilion at the Royal Pier and the Cambrian Hotel (later the United Theological College), both in Aberystwyth. He was also responsible for the Bridgnorth Castle Hill Railway in Shropshire, begun in 1891. The company, which still operates the railway today, was founded by Marks, who became its first managing director from 1891 until 1901. He was also the founder of the patent attorneys Marks & Clerk, who continue to trade. 

Marks continued his engineering practice alongside his patent interests. This included a partnership from 1890 with Sir George Newnes, which also concentrated on cliff railways, including an early stage development of Babbacombe Cliff Railway. In 1911 he set up an office in New York in conjunction with Thomas Edison.

Marks was a member of the Institution of Mechanical Engineers and an Associate Member of the Institution of Civil Engineers.

Political career
In 1906, Marks was elected as Member of Parliament (MP) for the North-Eastern or Launceston Division of Cornwall in the Liberal landslide general election victory.
He received a knighthood in 1911, served at the Ministry of Munitions during the First World War, and was awarded the CBE for work as a commissioner for the dilution of labour in 1917. He held his Parliamentary seat until it was abolished at the 1918 general election, when he was returned for the new Northern Division of Cornwall. He held that seat until his defeat at the 1924 general election.

In 1929, he left the Liberals and joined Ramsay MacDonald's Labour Party. His almost immediate reward came when he was raised to the peerage as Baron Marks, of Woolwich in the County of Kent on 16 July 1929.

Death
Marks continued his engineering and business activities and died at his home in Poole, Dorset in September 1938, aged 80. As he had no children, his peerage died with him.

Awards and memberships
Member, Institution of Mechanical Engineers
Associate Member, Institution of Civil Engineers, and Telford Premium Award, 1893-4
Knight of the Ducal Order of Ernest (Hungary), 1896
Knight Bachelor at the Coronation of George V, 1910
Commander, Order of the British Empire (C.B.E.), 1917
1st Baron Marks, of Woolwich, 16 July 1929

References

External links

 
George Croydon Marks @ The Peerage

People from Eltham
Alumni of King's College London
English engineers
Liberal Party (UK) MPs for English constituencies
UK MPs 1906–1910
UK MPs 1910
UK MPs 1910–1918
UK MPs 1918–1922
UK MPs 1922–1923
UK MPs 1923–1924
UK MPs who were granted peerages
Labour Party (UK) hereditary peers
Commanders of the Order of the British Empire
Barons in the Peerage of the United Kingdom
English knights
Works by George Croydon Marks
1858 births
1938 deaths
National Liberal Party (UK, 1922) politicians
Members of the Parliament of the United Kingdom for Launceston
Members of the Parliament of the United Kingdom for North Cornwall
Barons created by George V